685 Hermia is an S-type asteroid belonging to the Flora family in the Main Belt. Its diameter is about 11 km and it has an albedo of 0.281.

References

External links
 
 

Flora asteroids
Hermia
Hermia
S-type asteroids
19090812